Hu Jimin (traditional Chinese: 胡濟民; simplified Chinese: 胡济民; 1919–1998) was a Chinese nuclear physicist, plasma physicist and educator.

Life and career

Hu was born on 26 January 1919 in Rugao, Nantong, Jiangsu Province. In 1935, Hu studied in Nantong High School. In 1937, Hu entered the Department of Chemistry of Zhejiang University in Hangzhou, Zhejiang Province. Hu soon transferred into the Department of Physics, and studied under Prof. Wang Ganchang and Hsin Pei Soh. Hu graduated in 1942, and became a teaching assistant in the department.

In 1945, aided by the British Council, Hu went to study in UK. At beginning, Hu studied at the University of Birmingham, under Mark Oliphant. Hu obtained PhD from the University College London (UCL) in 1948, and his advisor was Harrie Massey. Hu was a research assistant at UCL.

In 1949, Hu returned China and at beginning taught at Zhejiang University Department of Physics. In the spring of 1955, Hu was transferred to Beijing, to establish a research institute of atomic physics.  In 1958, the institute was renamed as the Department of Technical Physics of Peking University, and Hu was its founding Chair, till 1986.

Hu was elected Academician of the Chinese Academy of Sciences (CAS) in 1980. Hu was former deputy director of CAS mathematics and physics division. Hu was former Director-general of the Chinese Society of Nuclear Physics, the former academic director of the National Laboratory of Heavy Ion Accelerator in Lanzhou (NLHIAL, 兰州重离子加速器国家实验室), and the former academic director of the Beijing National Tandem Accelerator Laboratory.

References
 
 The Biography of Nuclear Physicist Hu Jimin; Peking University Press; ; 1997.
 Hu Jimin; Jincheng Press; ; 2007.

External links
 Beijing Municipal Science and Technology Commission: Hu Jinmin
 Full biography of HU Jimin (incl. photos) at Hudong.com
 The historic complex between Zhejiang University and Peking University

1919 births
1998 deaths
Alumni of University College London
Chinese nuclear physicists
Educators from Nantong
Members of the Chinese Academy of Sciences
Academic staff of Peking University
Physicists from Jiangsu
Scientists from Nantong
Zhejiang University alumni
Academic staff of Zhejiang University
Chinese plasma physicists